Bruno Bertotti (24 December 1930 – 20 October 2018) was an Italian physicist, emeritus professor at the University of Pavia. He was one of the last students of physicist Erwin Schrödinger.

Bertotti was well known for his contributions to general relativity – particularly the Bertotti-Robinson electrovacuum, an exact solution of the Einstein field equation. He has also obtained a more accurate measurement of the parameter gamma of the parameterized post-Newtonian formalism, with the Cassini radioscience experiment. The PPN gamma parameter measures the curvature of space in the metric theory of gravitation and it is equal to one in general relativity.

More recent studies  revealed that the measured value of the PPN parameter gamma is affected by gravitomagnetic effect caused by the orbital motion of Sun around the barycenter of the solar system. The gravitomagnetic effect in the Cassini radioscience experiment was implicitly postulated by Bertotti as having a pure general relativistic origin but its theoretical value has been never tested in the experiment which effectively makes the experimental uncertainty in the measured value of gamma actually larger (by a factor of 10) than that claimed by Bertotti and co-authors in Nature.

Between 1953 and 1956, Bertotti worked as a scholar at the Dublin Institute for Avanced Studies. Following, Bertotti was a visiting scholar at the Institute for Advanced Study in Princeton, in 1958-59. In 2007 he was awarded the Italian Gold Medal for Merit in Science and Culture.
Among the last scholars in relativity from the University of Pavia are Alessandro Spallicci and Alberto Vecchio.

References

1930 births
2018 deaths
20th-century Italian physicists
Academic staff of the University of Pavia
Institute for Advanced Study visiting scholars
Scientists from Mantua

Academics of the Dublin Institute for Advanced Studies